North Dakota Constitutional Measure 1 of 2004, is an amendment to the North Dakota Constitution that makes it unconstitutional for the state to recognize or perform same-sex marriages or civil unions.  The referendum was approved by 73% of the voters.

The text of the amendment states:
Marriage consists only of the legal union between a man and a woman. No other domestic union, however denominated, may be recognized as a marriage or given the same or substantially equivalent legal effect.

Results

See also
 LGBT rights in North Dakota

References

LGBT in North Dakota
U.S. state constitutional amendments banning same-sex unions
North Dakota law
2004 in LGBT history
Constitutional Measure 1
2004 ballot measures
Same-sex marriage ballot measures in the United States